The 1878 Haddington Burghs by-election was fought on 3 August 1878.  The byelection was fought due to the resignation of the incumbent Liberal MP, Sir Henry Ferguson Davie.  It was won by the Liberal candidate Lord William Hay.

References

Haddington Burghs by-election
1870s elections in Scotland
Politics of East Lothian
Haddington Burghs by-election
Haddington Burghs by-election
By-elections to the Parliament of the United Kingdom in Scottish constituencies